For other places with the same name, see Wazirabad (disambiguation)

Wazirabad near Wazirabad barrage is a village in Delhi in the Nation Capital Region. It lies in the Civil Lines subdivision of the North Delhi district.

References

Villages in North Delhi district